Hrdlořezy is a municipality and village in Mladá Boleslav District in the Central Bohemian Region of the Czech Republic. It has about 700 inhabitants.

Geography
It lies in the Jizera Table. The municipality is situated on the right bank of the Jizera River.

History
The first written mention of Hrdlořezy is from 1406. It was a typical agricultural village.

Sights
The landmark of Hrdlořezy is the Chapel of Saint John of Nepomuk in the centre of the village.

Gallery

References

External links

Villages in Mladá Boleslav District